Michael or Mike Gallagher may refer to:

Politics
 Michael Gallagher (academic) (born 1951), British political scientist at Trinity College, Dublin, inventor of the Gallagher Index
 Michael Gallagher (British politician) (1934–2015), British MEP 1979–1984
 Michael Gallagher (political advisor) (born 1964), American presidential adviser and president and CEO of the Entertainment Software Association
 Mike Gallacher (born 1961), Australian politician
 Mike Gallagher (American politician) (born 1984), Member of U.S. House of Representatives from Wisconsin's 8th congressional district
 Mike Gallagher (political commentator) (born 1960), American radio host and conservative political commentator

Sports
 Michael Gallagher (Australian footballer) (born 1966), Australian rules footballer
 Michael Gallagher (cyclist) (born 1978), Australian Paralympic cyclist
 Michael Gallagher (soccer) (born 1994), United Soccer League Player (Portland Timbers 2)
 Mike Gallagher (footballer) (died 1984), Irish association football player (Hibernian FC)
 Mike Gallagher (skier) (1941–2013), American cross-country skier

Arts and media
 Michael Gallagher (guitarist) (fl. 1994–2010), ex-guitarist of the American band Isis
 Michael Gallagher (journalist) (born 1958), American journalist
 Michael Gallagher (postman and prognosticator) (fl. 2007–2015), Irish amateur weather forecaster
 Michael Gallagher (translator) (born 1930), American translator of Japanese literature 
 Michael Gallagher (writer) (born 1951), American comic book and satire writer
 Michael B. Gallagher (born 1945), American painter
 Michael J. Gallagher (artist), American artist
 Michael P. Gallagher, founder of the Stevie Awards
 Mick Gallagher (born 1945), British keyboardist
 Michael J. Gallagher, writer/director of the 2016 film The Thinning

Others
 Michael Gallagher (bishop) (1866–1937), American bishop
 Michael C. Gallagher (born 1943), American academic administrator
 Michael R. Gallagher (retired 2004), American chief executive
 Michael Gallagher, played by Paul Newman in the 1981 American drama Absence of Malice

See also
 Gallagher (surname), a surname (including a list of people with the name)